Ann H. Rest (born April 24, 1942) is an American politician and President pro tempore of the Minnesota Senate. A member of the Minnesota Democratic–Farmer–Labor Party (DFL), she represents District 45, which includes portions of the western suburbs of Hennepin County in the Twin Cities metro area.

Early life, education, and career
Rest attended Rich Township High School in Park Forest, Illinois, graduating in 1960, then went on to Northwestern University in Evanston, Illinois, where she received her B.A. in Latin and Greek. She then attended the University of Chicago on a Woodrow Wilson Fellowship and earned a M.A. in Latin and Greek. She later received an M.A. in Teaching from Harvard University, a Masters in Business Taxation from the University of Minnesota, and a Masters of Public Administration from Harvard's John F. Kennedy School of Government through a Bush Fellowship. She is a retired Certified Public Accountant.

Minnesota Legislature
Rest was first elected to the Senate in 2000, and was re-elected in 2002, 2006, 2010, 2012, and 2016. She served as an assistant majority leader from 2003 to 2007 and Senate President 2013–2017.

Before being elected to the Senate, Rest represented District 46A in the Minnesota House of Representatives for 16 years, being first elected in 1984, and re-elected in 1986, 1988, 1990, 1992, 1994, 1996 and 1998. She was an assistant majority leader of the House from 1989 to 1991. She chaired the House Tax Committee from 1993 to 1997, and the House Local Government and Metropolitan Affairs Committee from 1997 to 1999. She chaired the Senate State and Local Government Operations and Oversight Committee from 2007 to 2011.

For the 2021-2022 92nd Biennium Legislature, Rest is serving on the following committees of Housing Finance and Policy and Rules and Administration. Rest is also Ranking Minority Chair of the Taxes committee.

Her special legislative concerns include tax policy, education funding, and transportation.

Personal life
Rest has been active on numerous government and community boards through the years. She is a member of the National Caucus of Environmental Legislators, and NCSL's Executive Committee's Task Force on State and Local Taxation. She is the second Vice President of the Streamline States Governing Board.  She serves on Minnesota's Legislative Audit Commission. Rest was a member of the Minnesota Statehood Sesquicentennial Commission (2006–2008) and served on the Minnesota Capitol Area Architectural Planning Board and the Capitol Preservation Commission. Rest is a Minnesota delegate to the Great Lakes Commission and was a founding member of the Great Lakes Legislative Caucus, which she also chaired.

References

External links

Senator Ann Rest official Minnesota Senate website
Minnesota Public Radio Votetracker: Senator Ann Rest
Project Vote Smart - Senator Ann Rest Profile

|-

1942 births
21st-century American politicians
21st-century American women politicians
Democratic Party members of the Minnesota House of Representatives
Democratic Party Minnesota state senators
Harvard Graduate School of Education alumni
Harvard Kennedy School alumni
Living people
Methodists from Minnesota
People from New Hope, Minnesota
University of Minnesota alumni
Women state legislators in Minnesota